Badr Jafar (Arabic: بدر حميد جعفر‎) is an Emirati businessperson and philanthropist.

Overview
He is the Chief Executive Officer of Crescent Enterprises, a conglomerate headquartered in the United Arab Emirates with operations in ports and logistics, power and engineering, and venture capital. Jafar is also the President of Crescent Enterprises' sister company Crescent Petroleum. He is the Chairman of Pearl Petroleum, a five-member international consortium for the development of natural gas assets in the Kurdistan Region of Iraq, and the Chairman of the Executive Board of Gulftainer, a port and logistics operator.

Jafar is the Founder of the Pearl Initiative, an organization that promotes corporate governance, accountability and transparency within the Gulf region of the Middle East, launched in 2010 at the United Nations.

In 2011, Jafar was named a Young Global Leader by the World Economic Forum and is a member of its Stewardship Board.

He was named one of the 100 most powerful Arabs by Arabian Business and Gulf Business in 2019 and 2021.

Early life and education
Badr Jafar was born and raised in Sharjah in the United Arab Emirates. In 1994, he continued his education at Eton College and graduated in 1999 from the University of Cambridge with a master's degree in engineering and additional studies in astrophysics. Jafar subsequently attended the Cambridge Judge Business School.

Jafar is currently a member of the advisory boards of the Cambridge Judge Business School, the American University of Beirut and the American University of Sharjah. He is also a Foundation Fellow of Eton College.

Other work
Jafar is Chairman of Endeavor UAE. He is also on the Board of Advisors for Sharjah Entrepreneurship Centre (Sheraa) and Gaza Sky Geeks, a startup accelerator and technology education hub in Gaza.

In 2011, he partnered with music producer Quincy Jones to create Global Gumbo Group to develop music and arts ventures in the Middle East. The group launched Dubai Music Week in 2013.

In 2014, he launched the Arab World Social Entrepreneurship Program in partnership with Ashoka, a social entrepreneurship organization, aimed at identifying and scaling the region's social businesses.

In January 2023, he was appointed as COP28 representative for business and philanthropy.

Philanthropy
In 2011, Jafar launched the Middle East Theatre Academy (META), a non-profit theatre academy. In the same year, Jafar and music producer Quincy Jones produced a charity single titled Tomorrow/Bokra (Arabic: بكرا) featuring 26 Arab artists, to raise funds for educational arts projects for displaced youth in the Middle East. They announced the relaunch of Tomorrow/Bokra with new artists for its 10th anniversary.

In 2014, the Kennedy Centre honored Jafar with a Gold Medal in the Arts "in recognition of his efforts with cultural diplomacy to build closer ties between nations and regions".

In 2015, he was appointed by the United Nations Secretary General onto the High Level Panel on Humanitarian Financing, formed "to address the increasing gap between resources and financing for the world's humanitarian needs".

In 2018, Jafar and his wife joined The Giving Pledge, a philanthropic initiative launched by Bill Gates, Melinda Gates, and Warren Buffett.

In 2019, he was appointed to UNESCO’s Futures of Education International Commission.

Jafar is the Founding Patron of the Centre for Strategic Philanthropy based at the University of Cambridge, which was launched in 2020.

In September 2021, Jafar announced the launch of the Strategic Philanthropy Initiative at New York University Abu Dhabi to promote philanthropy within the MENA region.

Jafar is on the board of advisors of the International Rescue Committee (IRC) and the US-based Milken Institute for Strategic Philanthropy.

Personal life

He is married to Razan Khalifa Al Mubarak, the Managing Director of the Environment Agency Abu Dhabi and the current President of the International Union for the Conservation of Nature (IUCN). They have a daughter.

References

External links 
 

Living people
1979 births
People from the Emirate of Sharjah
Emirati businesspeople
Emirati chief executives
Emirati people of Iraqi descent
Alumni of the University of Cambridge
Giving Pledgers
21st-century philanthropists
People educated at Eton College